Pedro Fernández Manrique y Vivero, 2nd Count de Osorno  (c. 1453–1515) was a Spanish nobleman.

He was the son of Don Gabriel Fernández Manrique, 1st Count de Osorno and of Aldonza de Vivero.

Descendants
In 1482, the Count married Teresa de Toledo, daughter of García Álvarez de Toledo, 1st Duke of Alba, with whom he had seven children. He married for a second time with María de Cabrera y Bobadilla, daughter of Andrés de Cabrera, 1st Marquis of Moya, with whom he had one more child.

By Teresa de Toledo:
 García Fernández Manrique, 3rd Count of Osorno (1483–1546)
 Gabriel Manrique
 Pedro Manrique
 Juan Manrique
 Aldonza Manrique
 María Manrique
 Beatriz Manrique

By María de Cabrera:
 Pedro Manrique de Bobadilla

Ancestry

Additional information

Notes

Sources

1450s births
1515 deaths
Pedro 02